Parasoft DTP (formerly Parasoft Concerto) is a development testing solution from Parasoft that acts as a centralized hub for managing software quality and application security. DTP provides a wide range of traditional software reports from normal software development activities, such as coding and testing, and is also able to aggregate data from various software testing practices (i.e. static code analysis, unit testing, and API testing) to present a comprehensive view of the state of the codebase. DTP provides software testing analytics via an internal intelligence engine. 

 DTP comes with built-in algorithms that perform various analytics such as aggregated code coverage, which is a method of collecting coverage data from multiple test runs as well as different types of testing activities like manual testing and unit testing, and change-based testing, which is a form of impact analysis that helps understand which tests need to be run in order to validate changes, as well which tests can safely be skipped.

DTP's web-based UI provides interactive reports and dashboards, including a user-configurable reporting system with full open published APIs to put data in from any software development or testing tool. The Process Intelligence Engine (PIE) in DTP provides analytic capabilities and is open for developers and managers to customize to their individual needs, as well as extend with new algorithms and analytics. The reports in DTP give developers and QA team members the ability to monitor and track how the software is being implemented across multiple builds and aggregated across all software testing practices.

Overview
Parasoft DTP was originally known as Parasoft Concerto and integrates with third-party tools such as HP Quality Center, IBM Rational RequisitePro, Concurrent Versions System, Subversion, and other development infrastructure components. It was introduced in 2009. In 2012 DTP won the "Best of Show" Embeddy award from VDC Research. 

DTP can be used with:
 Agile software development
 Extreme Programming
 Hybrid methodologies
 Scrum

It includes pre-configured templates for:
 American National Standards Institute 62304 for Medical Device Software development
 DO-178B
 IEC 61508 & Safety Integrity Level
 U.S. Food and Drug Administration General Principles of Software Validation
 ISO 26262 & ASIL
 Joint Strike Fighter Program
 Safety-critical Software Development
 Motor Industry Research Association
 Safety Integrity Level

The templates combine automated testing with the process recommendations and requirements outlined in common guidelines (e.g., 
integration of code review and defect prevention practices such as static analysis, unit testing, functional testing, software performance testing, and regression testing throughout the SDLC).

References

External links 
 Parasoft DTP Advanced Analytics and Reporting home page

Software development process
Software testing tools
Workflow applications
Software project management